The Australian emerald (Hemicordulia australiae) is a species of dragonfly in the family Corduliidae. 
It can be found in Australia,
Lord Howe Island, Norfolk Island, Lesser Sunda Islands and New Zealand.
It is a small to medium-sized, long-legged dragonfly coloured black-metallic and yellow.
In both males and females the inboard edge of the hindwing is rounded.

The Australian emerald appears similar to the tau emerald (Hemicordulia tau).

Gallery

References

Corduliidae
Insects of Australia
Insects described in 1842